The Atum gas field is a natural gas field located offshore the Cabo Delgado Province. It was discovered in 2012 and developed by Anadarko Petroleum. It began production in 2012 and produces natural gas and condensates. The total proven reserves of the Atum gas field are around 30 trillion cubic feet (857 km³), and production is slated to be around 200 million cubic feet/day (5.8×105m³).

References

Natural gas fields in Mozambique